Linköping HC Dam or LHC Dam is an ice hockey team in the Swedish Women's Hockey League (SDHL). They are the representative women's ice hockey team of Linköping HC, a sports club based in Linköping, Östergötland, Sweden, and play at the Stångebro Ishall. LHC Dam won the Swedish Championship in 2014 and 2015.

History 
In 2006, the Linköping HC organization committed to becoming the best club for women's ice hockey in Sweden, stating that the women's team would be one of the club’s elite teams, on equal footing with the men's team and the men's junior teams. The team made its debut in the group stage of the 2007–08 season of Division 1 (since renamed Damettan) and swept the eight-game series. Their early success earned the LHC Dam a spot in the top-tier, newly-restructured and renamed Riksserien (since renamed the Svenska damhockeyligan), where they finished the 2008 season in fourth place after losing the bronze medal game to Modo HK. The 2007–08 roster featured home-grown Swedish players, including veteran Sophie Westlund and rising stars 19 year old Jenni Asserholt and 16 year old Fanny Rask, alongside an impressive collection of young international talent, including Austrian national team phenom Denise Altmann and Slovak national team teammates, forward Iveta Karafiátová Frühauf and goaltender Zuzana Tomčíková.

In the 2008–09 Riksserien season, LHC Dam lost in the quarterfinals after finishing the regular season in fifth place. The team gradually increased their standing over the subsequent seasons, ranking fourth in 2010 and winning bronze in 2011.

The team won the Swedish Championship in 2014. Not content to rest on their laurels, Linköping went on to win all 28 regular season games in the 2014–15 season and successfully defended the Swedish Championship in the 2015 SDHL playoffs, defeating AIK in the second consecutive playoff finals.

Season-by-season results 
This is a partial list of the most recent seasons completed by Linköping HC Dam.Note: Rank = Rank at end of regular season; GP = Games played, W = Wins (3 points), OTW = Overtime wins (2 points), OTL = Overtime losses (1 point), L = Losses, GF = Goals for, GA = Goals against, Pts = Points, Top scorer: Points (Goals+Assists)

Players and personnel

2021–22 roster 

 

Coaching staff and team personnel
 Head coach: Thomas Pettersen
 Assistant coach: Alexander Hanning
 Goaltending coach: Kim Martin Hasson
 Development coach: Madeleine Östling
 Equipment managers: Denise Altmann & Andreas Rehn
 Physiotherapist: Robin Jarl

Team captains 
 Hanna Dahl, 2007–2012
 Jenni Asserholt, 2012–2015
 Kristina Vikdahl, 2015–16
 Minttu Tuominen, 2016–17
 Denise Altmann, 2017–18
 Ingrid Morset, 2018–2020
 Madelen Haug Hansen, 2020–

Head coaches 
 Peter Jonsson, 2007–08
 Johanna Olsson, 2008–09
 Roy Bergström & Peter Jonsson, 2009–10
 Jens Brändström, 2010–2012
 Johan Bunnstedt, 2012–13
 Daniel Elander, 2013–14
 Peter Frantz, 2014–2016
 Martin Andler, 2016–17
 Madeleine Östling, 2017–2020
 Thomas Pettersen, 2020–2022
 Simon Hedefalk, 2022–

General managers 
 Johan Bunnstedt, –2015
 Kim Martin Hasson, 2015–2019

Team honors

Swedish Women's Hockey League 
  Swedish Champions (2): 2014, 2015
  Runners-up (3): 2016, 2018, 2019
  Third Place (1): 2011

IIHF European Women's Champions Cup

  Runners-up (1): 2014–15

Team records and leaders

Single-season records 
For statistics measured by percentage or average, skaters playing in less than 80% of games and goaltenders playing in 10 or fewer games in a season not included.

 Most goals in a season: Lara Stalder, 39 goals (36 games; 2017–18)
 Most assists in a season: Denise Altmann, 43 assists (28 games; 2014–15)
 Most points in a season: Denise Altmann, 67 points (28 games; 2014–15)
 Most points in a season, defenceman: Lara Stalder, 61 points (36 games; 2017–18)
 Most points per game (P/G) in a season: Denise Altmann, 2.39 P/G (28 games; 2014–15)
 Most penalty minutes (PIM) in a season: Jennifer Wakefield, 63 PIM (30 games; 2016–17)
 Best save percentage (SVS%) in a season: Kim Martin Hasson, .956 SVS% (17 games; 2016–17)
 Best goals against average (GAA) in a season: Vendela Jonsson, 0.91 GAA (11 games; 2014–15)

Career records 
Most career goals: Denise Altmann, 277 goals (337 games; 2007–2020)
Most career assists: Denise Altmann, 286 assists (337 games; 2007–2020)
Most career points: Denise Altmann, 563 points (337 games; 2007–2020)
Most career points, defenceman: Emma Holmbom, 129 points (253 games; 2008–2018)
Most career points per game (P/G): Lara Stalder, 1.833 P/G (54 games; 2017–2019)
Most career penalty minutes: Jenn Wakefield, 215 PIM (94 games; 2014–2021)
Most games played, skater: Denise Altmann, 337 games (2007–2020)
Most games played, goaltender: Florence Schelling, 62 games (2015–2018)

===All-time scoring leaders===
The top ten point-scorers in Linköping HC Dam history, from the 2007–08 season through the 2020–21 season.

Note: Nat = Nationality; Pos = Position; GP = Games played; G = Goals; A = Assists; Pts = Points; P/G = Points per game;  = current Linköping HC player

Sources:

Notable alumni 
Years active with Linköping listed alongside player name.
 Matildah Andersson, 2009–2015
 Jenni Asserholt, 2007–08 & 2009–2015
 Hanna Dahl, 2007–2012
 Lisa Danielsson, 2007–2014
 Emma Holmbom, 2008–2018
 Vendela Jonsson, 2010–2015
 Anna Kjellbin, 2010–2019
 Anna Rydberg, 2010–2018
 Kristina Vikdahl, 2009–2016

International players
Flag indicates nation of primary IIHF eligibility.

 Christa Alanko, 2013–2015
 Amalie Andersen, 2016–2019
 Josephine Asperup, 2018–19
 Ashley Bairos, 2013–14
 Bailey Bram, 2013–14
 Virginia Ernst, 2009–10
 Georgina Farman, 2014–2018
 Jennica Haikarainen, 2009–2012
 Lyndal Heineman, 2008–2010
 Tori Hickel, 2019–20
 Zoe Hickel, 2019–20
 Gracen Hirschy, 2020–21
 Tatiana Ištocyová, 2018–19
 Nicole Jackson, 2016–17
 Fanny Jalonen, 2008–09
 Iveta Karafiátová Frühauf, 2007–2010
 Anna Kilponen, 2019–20
 Laura Kluge, 2016–17
 Andrea Lanzl, 2016–17
 Kamilla Lund Nielsen, 2011–2014
 Kennedy Marchment, 2018–19
 Julia Marty, 2013–14
 Stefanie Marty, 2013–2015
 Nadia Mattivi, 2017–18
 Rhyen McGill, 2020–21
 Sidney Morin, 2018–19
 Anna Neuenschwander, 2019–2021
 Emma-Sofie Nordström, 2020–21
 Suzanne Ostrow, 2012–13
 Pia Pren, 2015–16
 Mia Sakström, 2007–2009
 Florence Schelling, 2015–2018
 O'Hara Shipe, 2009–2011
 Brooke Stacey, 2018–19
 Lara Stalder, 2017–2019
 Shannon Stewart, 2015–16
 Simona Studentová, 2015–16
 Eveliina Suonpää, 2018–2020
 Nicoline Söndergaard Jensen, 2016–2019
 Vilma Tanskanen, 2019–20
 Susanna Tapani, 2019
 Celine Tardif, 2020–21
 Haruka Toko, 2019–20
 Zuzana Tomčíková, 2007–08
 Nikola Tomigova, 2012–13
 Minnamari Tuominen, 2016–17
 Carrigan Umpherville, 2020–21
 Saana Valkama, 2019–20
 Sophia Volgger, 2015–16
 Jennifer Wakefield, 2014–2017 & 2020–21
 Claudia Weltermann, 2008–09
 Savine Wielenga, 2007–08
 Charlotte Wittich, 2012–13

References 
Content in this article is translated from the existing Swedish Wikipedia article at :sv:Linköping HC Dam; see its history for attribution.

External links 
 Official website 
 Team information and statistics from Eliteprospects.com and Eurohockey.com and Hockeyarchives.info (in French)

Women's ice hockey in Sweden
Ice hockey teams in Sweden
Swedish Women's Hockey League teams
Ice hockey teams in Östergötland County
Linköping HC